Kodumbalur is a village in Tamil Nadu, India.  It is the site of the Moovar Koil temple complex.

Location
It is located at a distance of 35km from Trichy and 40km from Pudukkottai. The name Kodumbalur has been mentioned in the Tamil epic Cilappatikaram.

Architecture
The architectural structure existed here are the forerunner for Dravidiyan style. The remaining structures of Moovar Koil and Mujukundeeswarer temple attract many tourists to this place. It is under the control of Archaeological Survey of India.

References

External links 

Temples in Kodumbalur from Chapter IV of Early "Chola Temples"
 Kodumbalur - Virtual Heritage Tour: http://www.pudukkottai.info/traditional/places/kodumbalur/
 Kodumbalur - Pudukkottai Info: http://www.pudukkottai.info/node/21

Villages in Pudukkottai district